The Morning Times was an English language daily newspaper in Ceylon published by Times of Ceylon Limited (TOCL). It was founded in 1954 and was published from Colombo. It ceased publication in 1958.

References

1954 establishments in Ceylon
1958 disestablishments in Ceylon
Defunct daily newspapers published in Sri Lanka
Defunct English-language newspapers published in Sri Lanka
Publications established in 1954
Publications disestablished in 1958
Times of Ceylon Limited